Duchess of Rutland is a title given to the wife of the Duke of Rutland, an extant title in the peerage of England which was created in 1703.

People
Catherine Wriothesley Noel (1657–1733), third wife of the 1st Duke
Catherine Russell (1676–1711), first wife of the 2nd Duke
Lady Lucy Sherard (1685–1751), second wife of the 2nd Duke
The Hon. Bridget Sutton (1699–1734), wife the 3rd Duke
Lady Mary Isabella Somerset (1756–1831), wife of the 4th Duke
Lady Elizabeth Howard (1780–1825), wife of the 5th Duke
Janetta Hughan (1837–1899), second wife of the 7th Duke
Marion Margaret Violet Lindsay (1856–1937), wife of the 8th Duke
Kathleen Tennant (1894–1989), wife of the 9th Duke
Anne Bairstow Cumming-Bell (1924–2002), first wife of the 10th Duke
Frances Helen Sweeny (b. 1937), second wife of the 10th Duke
Emma L J Watkins (b. 1963), wife of David Manners, 11th Duke of Rutland

Ships
Two ships have been named Duchess of Rutland:
 Duchess of Rutland (1786 ship)
 Duchess of Rutland (1799 ship)

References